The 2014–15 South Carolina Gamecocks women's basketball team represented University of South Carolina during the 2014–15 NCAA Division I women's basketball season. The Gamecocks, led by seventh year head coach Dawn Staley, played their home games at the Colonial Life Arena and were members of the Southeastern Conference. The Gamecocks repeated as Southeastern Conference regular season Champions; however, it was shared with Tennessee this year. The 2014-15 Gamecocks won their first SEC Tournament Championship by beating Tennessee 62–46. USC received a #1 seed in the 2015 Women's NCAA Tournament where they advanced to the final four where they lost 66–65 to Notre Dame, as Tiffany Mitchell's desperation three in the final seconds came up short.

Recruits

Roster

Schedule

|-
!colspan=9 style="background:#73000A; color:#FFFFFF;" | Exhibition

|-
!colspan=9 style="background:#73000A; color:#FFFFFF;"| Non-conference Regular Season

|-
!colspan=9 style="background:#73000A; color:#FFFFFF;"| SEC Regular Season

|-
!colspan=9 style="background:#73000A; color:#FFFFFF;" | SEC Tournament

|-
!colspan=9 style="background:#73000A; color:#FFFFFF;" | NCAA Women's Tournament

Source

Rankings

See also
2014–15 South Carolina Gamecocks men's basketball team

References

South Carolina Gamecocks women's basketball seasons
South Carolina
South Carolina
NCAA Division I women's basketball tournament Final Four seasons